Tabestanaq (also Romanized as Tābestānaq; also known as Tābeslānaq) is a village in Chahardangeh Rural District, Hurand District, Ahar County, East Azerbaijan Province, Iran. At the 2006 census, its population was 473, in 113 families.

References 

Populated places in Ahar County